Bishnarat (Bişnarat) is a rural locality (a village) in Staroyantuzovsky Selsoviet, Dyurtyulinsky District, Bashkortostan, Russia. The population was 15 in 2010. There is one street.

Geography 
Bishnarat is located 29 km southeast of Dyurtyuli (the district's administrative centre) by road. Novoishmetovo is the nearest rural locality.

References 

Rural localities in Dyurtyulinsky District